Arno Herman Luehman (September 7, 1911 – December 5, 1989) was a major general in the United States Air Force.

Biography
Luehman was born in Milwaukee, Wisconsin on September 7, 1911.

He graduated from the United States Military Academy in 1934. During World War II, he served as Chief of Staff of Operations of the Third Air Force and as Chief of Staff of the Thirteenth Air Force. Following the war, he was assigned to work on Operation Crossroads. Later, he held a number of military positions in the United Nations. In 1949, he entered the National War College. Following graduation, he served as Deputy Director of Information of the Air Force before becoming Vice Commander of the Air University and Commandant of the Air War College. His retirement was effective as of September 1, 1966.

He died on December 5, 1989 in Bethesda, Maryland.

References

Military personnel from Milwaukee
United States Air Force generals
United States Army personnel of World War II
United States Military Academy alumni
National War College alumni
1911 births
1989 deaths